Radio Frontier is the only local commercial English-language radio station for the Geneva, Lausanne and Vaud regions of Switzerland and neighbouring France.

Background

Radio Frontier is completely independent. Its founders are Peter Sibley, British-born media entrepreneur, and Mark Butcher, previous
Programme Controller and Breakfast Show host of World Radio Geneva and World Radio Switzerland since 1996. The station is owned by the founders 
and a consortium of international investors who invest in the station through its parent company, Anglo Media - a specialist media group founded in 
December 2010 to develop Anglophone media companies in Europe.

History

The station broadcasts 24 hours a day from the border area of Switzerland and France and began broadcasting on June 1, 2011. 
The station is available on the internet via its multimedia portal www.radiofrontier.ch and via mobile phone applications.

Audience and programming

The station has been designed for the large international community of Anglophones in the region and it features a morning show presented by Mark Butcher from 7:00 to 11:00 as well as a "What's On" segment about local events every thirty minutes and news three times every hour.

As an independent radio station managed by members of the international community, its editorial stance reflects on the real lives of the 
English speakers in the region and provides a local, relevant slant to its output which includes regional news, business news, sport, events 
and interactivity with its local audience. It also treats the borders between France and Switzerland as irrelevant.

Radio Frontier's programming objectives are to be both informal and well-informed, and to provide entertainment within the framework of 
essential local information. Its editorial and commercial framework provide an interactive media platform for the local community, for its 
audience and for local business.

Video Frontier is the radio station's on-line video portal which provides its listeners with short videos on local events, news, advertorials and also includes user-generated content from its audience.

Mission

Radio Frontier's distinctive mission statement is; "We Promise Not to be Boring."

Awards

The station was nominated for the International Radio Festival 2011 awards (an annual, international festival for the world's 
radio programme-makers) after a month on-air.

References

External links 

agefi.com
anglomediagroup.com

Internet radio stations
English-language radio stations
Radio stations established in 2011
Radio stations in Switzerland
2011 establishments in Switzerland